The  Asian Men's Volleyball Championship was the thirteenth staging of the Asian Men's Volleyball Championship, a biennial international volleyball tournament organised by the Asian Volleyball Confederation (AVC) with Thailand Volleyball Association (TVA). The tournament was held in Suphan Buri, Thailand from 20 to 27 September 2005.

Venues

Pools composition
The teams are seeded based on their final ranking at the 2003 Asian Men's Volleyball Championship.

* Kazakhstan withdrew, Vietnam moved from Pool C to B.

Preliminary round

Pool A

|}

|}

Pool B

|}

|}

Pool C

|}

|}

Pool D

|}

|}

Quarterfinals 
 The results and the points of the matches between the same teams that were already played during the preliminary round shall be taken into account for the Quarterfinals.

Pool E

|}

|}

Pool F

|}

|}

Pool G

|}

|}

Pool H

|}

|}

Classification 17th–18th

|}

Classification 13th–16th

Semifinals

|}

15th place

|}

13th place

|}

Classification 9th–12th

Semifinals

|}

11th place

|}

9th place

|}

Classification 5th–8th

Semifinals

|}

7th place

|}

5th place

|}

Final round

Semifinals

|}

3rd place

|}

Final

|}

Final standing

Awards
MVP:  Marcos Sugiyama
Best Scorer:  Yu Koshikawa
Best Spiker:  Lee Sun-kyu
Best Blocker:  Yejju Subba Rao
Best Server:  Lee Kyung-soo
Best Setter:  Kwon Young-min
Best Libero:  Yeo Oh-hyun

References
Asian Volleyball Confederation

V
A
Asian men's volleyball championships
V
Sport in Suphan Buri province